34th Street is a station on the Hudson–Bergen Light Rail (HBLR) in Bayonne, Hudson County, New Jersey. The third of four stations in the city of Bayonne, 34th Street is located at the intersection of Avenue E and East 34th Street, the station doubles as a park and ride with access to Route 440 southbound.

History

Jersey Central station
34th Street station was built just north of a former Central Railroad of New Jersey station, located at Avenue E and East 33rd Street. This station was known as East 33rd Street and, before that, it was known as Bayonne. The station opened on August 1, 1864 as part of a railroad connection between what would become Communipaw Terminal and the Bergen Point neighborhood. This was before the bridge across Newark Bay had been built which connected the railroad to the main line at Elizabethport. The depot was built on the westbound platform at the time and a new eastbound station was completed in 1901. The westbound depot was razed in 1962. East 33rd Street's eastbound depot became the main ticket agency, which was removed on April 30, 1967 as part of the Aldene Plan, which moved passenger service to the Lehigh Valley Railroad into Newark Penn Station. Passenger service through Bayonne and Jersey City was truncated to East 33rd Street as part of the Aldene Plan. The station depot was razed in 1969. Passenger service at East 33rd Street ended on August 6, 1978 when Conrail ended the shuttle between Cranford and East 33rd Street.

HBLR station
The modern station opened on April 15, 2000 as the terminus of the original minimum operating segment (MOS) of the Hudson–Bergen Light Rail.

Station layout
The station has two tracks and a single island platform, along with an overhead pedestrian bridge to the parking lot on Route 440. 34th Street station is accessible for handicapped people as part of the Americans with Disabilities Act of 1990. As a result, there are elevators for the pedestrian bridge, along with grade-level train access on the platforms. The station serves local service between 8th Street station in Bayonne and Hoboken Terminal, along with the Bayonne Flyer, an express service between Bayonne and Hoboken.

Connections

Since September 2007, the S89 bus route of the Metropolitan Transit Authority of the New York City metro area provides a link from 34th Street station to Staten Island. A 397-space park and ride lot has also been built at the station.

In 2005, eight PCC streetcars from the Newark City Subway were given to the Bayonne to be rehabilitated and operated along a proposed  loop to connect the station to MOTBY, the former naval base being redeveloped as cruise port, residential and recreation area. As of 2015, plans call for a pedestrian bridge over Route 440 connecting the station to the new developments. In 2017, the North Jersey Transportation Planning Authority allocated funds for the study of bridge plans for which the City of Bayonnne has $4 million to build.

References

Bibliography

External links

 Subway Nut station info and photos
Peninsula at Bayonne Harbor development plan
 34th Street entrance from Google Maps Street View
 Route 440 entrance from Google Maps Street View

Transportation in Bayonne, New Jersey
Hudson-Bergen Light Rail stations
Railway stations in the United States opened in 2000
2000 establishments in New Jersey
Former Central Railroad of New Jersey stations